Sepiadarium is a genus of cuttlefish comprising five species.

Species
 Genus Sepiadarium
 Sepiadarium auritum Robson, 1914
 Sepiadarium austrinum Berry, 1921, Southern Bottletail Squid
 Sepiadarium gracilis Voss, 1962
 Sepiadarium kochi Steenstrup, 1881, Tropical Bottletail Squid
 Sepiadarium nipponianum Berry, 1932

References

External links

Cuttlefish
Cephalopod genera